Mindaugas Špokas (born 13 May 1975) is a Lithuanian swimmer. He competed in the men's 100 metre backstroke event at the 1996 Summer Olympics.

References

External links
 

1975 births
Living people
Lithuanian male backstroke swimmers
Olympic swimmers of Lithuania
Swimmers at the 1996 Summer Olympics
Sportspeople from Kaunas